The Youth word of the year (German: Jugendwort des Jahres) is an annual publication which reviews trends in German youth language and names one new or recently popularized word as the most noteworthy. The winning word is chosen by a jury under the guidance of publishing company Langenscheidt, who specializes in language reference works. The competition has run since 2008, but no word was announced in 2019.

The competition stands in the tradition of assessments of a word of the year, the longest-running being the selection of the German word of the year by the Gesellschaft für deutsche Sprache (GfdS), which has been announced annually since 1977.

Selection process 
The public is invited to nominate words online, which are then narrowed down in a multi-step process. The jury has the final say over the winner and the runners-up; until 2020 there was no public voting and no formal inclusion of young people in the process. The criteria applied to the nominated words include 'linguistic creativity', 'originality', 'degree of proliferation', and 'societal and cultural events'.

History 
The selection of the youth word of the year is part of an annual publicity campaign for Langenscheidt's 100 Prozent Jugendsprache ("100 percent Youth Language"), a dictionary of new and old expressions used by German-speaking young people. After Langenscheidt was bought by publisher Pons in spring 2019, no youth word of the year was announced for that year, since the accompanying dictionary was not deemed to be ready. After some uncertainty about the future of the competition, 2020 saw a new edition of the youth word of the year, with the winning entry being decided in an online vote for the first time.

List of youth words of the year

Criticism and discussion 
A common criticism of the competition to find the 'youth word of the year' is that it is merely an elaborate advertising campaign for publisher Langenscheidt. Critics have also doubted whether the selected words are actually used by young people, especially since they are not the only group which can nominate words, but rather users of all age groups.

The Gesellschaft für deutsche Sprache called the competition a "nice idea". But GfdS' Lutz Kuntzsch added that he considered it "playing with language", and that he would not expect young people to actually use all or any of the nominated words.

Wolfgang Gaiser of the German Youth Institute, a social science research center in Munich, criticised that "this is more about a publisher's marketing than social science about how young people speak and think. Using such shenanigans to generate attention for publications and find new readers is a clever marketing gag. [...] When silly phrases are given center stage, and it is implied that this represents the level of speech and thought of today's youth, then this paints a distorted picture."

2009 
The word 'hartzen' was criticized for implying that unemployed people were lazy and were voluntarily living at the expense of the state.

2015 
The phrase 'Alpha-Kevin' meaning 'the dumbest possible person' (referencing the phenomenon of Kevinism, a German prejudice against persons with certain trendy names) was removed from the competition, because the jury felt it was discriminatory against real persons with the name. Additionally, journalists doubted that the word 'Smombie' had seen actual usage, given that no mentions prior to the competition could be found, and a large majority of young people had never heard of it. Critics speculated that the word could be an invention of Langenscheidt.

2020 
After Langenscheidt had decided to not crown a youth word of the year in 2019, the competition returned in 2020. The publisher had responded to criticism by giving more power to online users in the process. The publisher accepted nominations via its website, and the winning entry (the English word 'lost') was decided by online voting for the first time, rather than purely through a jury vote.

A minor controversy hinged on the nomination of the word 'Hurensohn' ('son of a whore', bastard), which was suggested en masse by the users of a German-language community on Reddit. The word had been part of a popular meme about speaking German. Responding to the flood of nominations, Langenscheid stated that 'Hurensohn' had been disqualified from the process because they would not consider expletives and slurs. However, the word was slated for inclusion in that year's annual dictionary of youth language.

See also
 Word of the year (Germany)
 Word of the year

Literature 

 100 % Jugendsprache 2019, Langenscheidt, Berlin 2018, ISBN 978-3-468-29884-4.

References

Lists of words
 
Germany
German language